William Lincoln Higgins (March 8, 1867 – November 19, 1951) was an American politician, physician, and US Representative from Connecticut from 1933 to 1937. A Republican from Coventry, Higgins also served four years as Secretary of the State of Connecticut and several terms in the Connecticut General Assembly.

Biography 
Born in Chesterfield, Massachusetts, Higgins attended the public schools of Chesterfield and Northampton and Deerfield Academy. He graduated from the medical department of the University of the City of New York in 1890 and commenced the practice of medicine in Willington, Connecticut, the same year. He moved to South Coventry, Connecticut, in 1891.

Higgins served in the Connecticut House of Representatives 1905–1907, 1917, 1919–1921, and 1925–1927. He served as member of the State Senate from 1909–1911. He was the first selectman of Coventry, Connecticut, from 1917–1932. He was the county commissioner of Tolland County, Connecticut, from 1921–1932. He served as Secretary of the State of Connecticut from 1929–1933. He was a delegate to the Republican National Conventions of 1928, 1932, and 1936.

Higgins was elected as a Republican to the Seventy-third and Seventy-fourth US Congresses (March 4, 1933 – January 3, 1937). He was an unsuccessful candidate for reelection in 1936 to the Seventy-fifth Congress.

After exiting politics, he resumed the practice of medicine in Coventry. His remains were cremated and interred in Chesterfield Center Cemetery in Chesterfield.

References

1867 births
1951 deaths
People from Chesterfield, Massachusetts
Republican Party members of the United States House of Representatives from Connecticut
Secretaries of the State of Connecticut
Republican Party Connecticut state senators
Republican Party members of the Connecticut House of Representatives
County commissioners in Connecticut
County officials in Connecticut
New York University Grossman School of Medicine alumni
People from Coventry, Connecticut